The 2019 EuroCup Finals will be the concluding games of the 2018–19 EuroCup season, the 17th season of Europe's secondary club basketball tournament organised by Euroleague Basketball, the 11th season since it was renamed from the ULEB Cup to the EuroCup, and the third season under the title sponsorship name of 7DAYS. The first leg played at the Fuente de San Luis arena in Valencia, Spain, on 9 April 2019, the second leg played at the Mercedes-Benz Arena in Berlin, Germany, on 12 April 2019 and the third leg, if necessary, was be played again at the Fuente de San Luis arena in Valencia, Spain, on 15 April 2019, between Spanish side Valencia Basket and German side Alba Berlin.

It will be the sixth Finals appearance in the competition for Valencia Basket and the second ever final appearance in EuroCup for Alba Berlin. Both teams met previously in the 2010 Finals played in Vitoria-Gasteiz, Spain, and Valencia beat the Germans by 67–44.

Valencia Basket has won the series 2-1 and also achieved qualification to the 2019–20 EuroLeague.

Venues

Road to the Finals

Note: In the table, the score of the finalist is given first (H = home; A = away).

First leg

Second leg

Third leg

Finals MVP

See also
2019 EuroLeague Final Four
2019 Basketball Champions League Final Four
2019 FIBA Europe Cup Finals

References

External links
Official website

Finals
2019
EuroCup Finals